Events from the year 1715 in France

Incumbents
 Monarch – Louis XIV (until 1 September), then Louis XV
Regent: Philip II of Orleans (from 1 September)

Events
Persian embassy to Louis XIV

Births
9 January – Robert-François Damiens, domestic servant, executed for the attempted assassination of Louis XV (died 1757)
12 January – Jacques Duphly, harpsichordist and composer (died 1789)
23 January – Jean-Olivier Briand, bishop of Quebec (died 1794)
30 January – Jean-Baptiste Lestiboudois, botanist (died 1804)
22 February – Charles-Nicolas Cochin, engraver (died 1790)
15 September – Jean-Baptiste Vaquette de Gribeauval, military officer, known for introducing the Gribeauval system (died 1789)

Deaths
 
8 January – Noël Bouton de Chamilly, military officer (born 1636)
29 January – Bernard Lamy, mathematician (born 1640)
20 May – Armand Jean de Vignerot du Plessis, sailor and nobleman (born 1629)
1 September – Louis XIV, King of France since 1643 (born 1638)
1 September – François Girardon, sculptor (born 1628)

See also

References

1710s in France